Sarvelat (also Romanized as Sarvelāt; also known as Sar Velāyat) is a village in Owshiyan Rural District, Chaboksar District, Rudsar County, Gilan Province, Iran. At the 2006 census, its population was 573, in 161 families.

References 

Populated places in Rudsar County